The Giro dell'Etna was a one-day road cycling race held annually in Sicily, Italy from 1980 until 2004.

From 2001 until its final edition 2004, the race was known as the Trofeo dell'Etna.

Winners

References

Men's road bicycle races
Recurring sporting events established in 1980
1980 establishments in Italy
Defunct cycling races in Italy
Sport in Sicily
Cycle races in Italy
2004 disestablishments in Italy
Recurring sporting events disestablished in 2004